María Felisa Martínez López (September 13, 1936 – February 16, 2013), known professionally as Marifé de Triana, was a Spanish singer, dancer and actress.

Early life 
Marifé de Triana was born in Burguillos in Seville. She lived in the neighborhood of Triana, leading to her nickname.

Career 
At age 20, she finished works of copla and was featured in films between 1957 and 1958, 1959 with Canto para ti. She was a pioneer film star in folklore films doing work that later was copied by other singers. In the 1960s she performed many festivals in much success in the theaters of Madrid, Lara, Princess Beatrice, Princess Elizabeth, Cervantes, Seville, Barcelona and all of Spain.

During the first half of the twentieth century, she mainly worked in theater, on lyrical spectacles alongside Spanish singers such as El principe Gitano, Juana Reina, Pepe Mairena and La niña de los Peines. She starred in Spanish and some European co-productions. She worked actors including Carmen Sevilla, Ángel de Andrés, Tony Leblanc, Manuel Alexandre and Conrado San Martín.

She was a singer well known for her drama, while singing songs known as the sand tower, The Death of Queen Mercedes and other songs of her repertoire also known.

During the 1990s she presented the radio program Lo que yo más quiero, on Canal Sur 2 Radio. On July 24, 2009 a tribute event was held, consisting of a play in the street in Triana and a Copla Contest that bore her name. She premiered a song called "Ay, Marifé". It was interpreted by Sevillian singer Cristina Crespo and composed by Francisco Miguel Alegre, Juan Eduardo Peso and David Díaz.

Personal life 

In 1970 she retired from film due to her husband's illness. Her husband José María died on April 26, 2008 at age 85. On November 11, 2011, she was awarded the Gold Medal for Meritorious Work. She died on February 16, 2013. She is buried in the Municipal Cemetery of Torremolinos, next to her husband.

References 

 
 
 
 
 >
 
 Newspapers of the time since the 1920s across Spain: La vanguardia, ABC, El heraldo de Madrid, El correo vasco, Ya, Blanco y Negro 
 Fallecimiento de José María Alonso Calvo
 Premios Motivos Que Celebrar de ABC Punto Radio
 Xanit Hospital Internacional
 Fallece la tonadillera Marifé de Triana, Diario de Sevilla.
 

1936 births
2013 deaths
Castanets players
Spanish film actresses
Spanish television actresses
20th-century Spanish women singers
20th-century Spanish singers